Eustheniidae is a family of insects in the order Plecoptera, the stoneflies. They are native to Australia, New Zealand, and Chile.

The nymphs live in lakes and in swift-flowing rivers and streams, where they cling to rocks. They are carnivorous. They take two to three years to develop into adults.

Genera include:
 Cosmioperla McLellan, 1996
 Eusthenia Westwood, 1832
 Neuroperla Illies, 1960
 Neuroperlopsis Illies, 1960
 Stenoperla McLachlan, 1867
 Thaumatoperla Tillyard, 1921
 † Boreoperlidium Sinitshenkova, 2013
 † Stenoperlidium Tillyard, 1935

References

Plecoptera families
Taxa named by Robert John Tillyard
Aquatic insects